Burnt by the Sun can refer to:

Burnt by the Sun, a Russian film
Burnt by the Sun or Weary Sun, the Russian version of the Polish tango To ostatnia niedziela by Jerzy Petersburski, which is the leading musical motive of the above film, and which gave it its title.
Burnt by the Sun 2, a sequel to the above film
Burnt by the Sun 2: The Citadel
Burnt by the Sun, a play by Peter Flannery, based on the film
 Burnt by the Sun (band), an American metalcore band
Burnt by the Sun (EP)